The Tinginae are a subfamily of lace bugs (family Tingidae). Three tribes were included in Froeschner's analysis.

References

Further reading
Drake, C.J. & Ruhoff, F.A., 1960. Lace-bug genera of the world. (Hemiptera: Tingidae). Proc. U.S. Natl. Mus. 112 (3431): 1-105, 9 pls.
Drake, C.J. & Ruhoff, F.A., 1965. Lace-bugs of the world: a catalogue. (Hemiptera: Tingidae). Bulletin of the United States National Museum: 243, 1-643.

Tingidae